Southern Transdanubia is a statistical (NUTS 2) region of Hungary. It is part of the Transdanubia (NUTS 1) region. Southern Transdanubia includes the counties of Somogy, Tolna, and Baranya. Its capital is the city of Pécs.

See also
List of regions of Hungary

References 

 
NUTS 2 statistical regions of the European Union